Rayno Seegers (born 29 February 1952) is a South African former professional tennis player.

Seegers, an alumnus of Afrikaanse Hoër Seunskool in Pretoria, played collegiate tennis for the UCLA Bruins in 1973. He was a mixed doubles quarter-finalist at the 1974 Wimbledon Championships, partnering American Carrie Meyer.

References

External links
 
 

1952 births
Living people
South African male tennis players
UCLA Bruins men's tennis players